Ghost is a 2019 Indian horror thriller film written and directed by Vikram Bhatt and produced by Vashu Bhagnani Production. The film bankrolled by Loneranger Productions, features Sanaya Irani and Shivam Bhaargava in the lead roles. The story of the film follows Karan Khanna (played by Bhaargava), a politician of Indian origin in the United Kingdom, who is accused of killing his wife. He tells his lawyer that a spirit committed the murder and should be tried.
 Principal photography commenced in November 2018 in London. It was released on 18 October 2019.

Plot
The film starts with a girl named Barkha Khanna (Gayathiri Iyer), supposedly killed by a vengeful ghost in her room which is later noticed by her husband, Karan Khanna, a political figure from England. The Metropolitan Police force subsequently arrest him, accusing him of murdering his wife.

Meanwhile, Simran (Sanaya Irani), a lawyer having her own stress-related issues and with a dependency on morphine, is going through an emotional time as her father recently passed away and her boyfriend (a judge) too broke up with her. Simran, after the insistence of Karan's campaign manager, Bob, reluctantly agrees to take on the case. After getting him out on bail, she learns that Karan and Barkha were not a happy couple and Karan, on Valentine's Day, saw someone sending a locket to Barkha. Karan suspected that his wife is having an affair and himself started an affair as a result. However, his wife was killed one night, and CCTV footage shows Karan entering his apartment at 2 am and leaving at 4 am (which is the time of death of his wife) and again entering the apartment at 6 am and all the evidence is pointing against him.

However, Karan claims that he spent that night at Bob's apartment as he was not able to drive. Meanwhile, Bob notices something and departs for a mental institute in Leeds. He calls Karan, telling him that he knows whose spirit is doing all these but before he could tell who is behind all these, Bob himself is killed by that ghost who had previously killed Barkha. After more investigation, Simran found that Karan was with a girl on the night his wife died but that girl was missing in the police report. After consulting a demonologist, it was revealed that that girl was possessed and Karan was also possessed, and being under possession he actually killed Barkha and that's why he didn't remember that night very much. Further, it was revealed that Barkha was in a lesbian relationship with a girl but instead married Karan for fame and money. When that girl blackmailed Barkha to tell the truth or bear the consequences, she was taken to the mental institute. There she met Simran's father (Vikram Bhatt), a doctor. That girl committed suicide so that she can take revenge on those three after becoming a ghost. She gave a locket to Simran's father and told him to deliver it to Barkha after her death. It was also revealed that the locket contained all her power. Later the missing girl was found dead and the blame fell upon Karan. Simran, with the help of her ex-boyfriend, conducted an exorcism during which the ghost took control over Karan. Simran broke the locket in the nick of time. Thus, Karan got saved and finally proved his innocence. Karan and Simran confess their love for each other. Later Karan gave a party in his house after winning the election, and a cellmate of the deceased girl gave him a box. Unknown to Karan, it had the broken locket inside, indicating that the curse is not over yet.

Cast
 Sanaya Irani as Defence Lawyer Simran Singh
 Shivam Bhaargava as Karan Khanna
 Hazel Crowney  as psychic Neena
 Gayathiri Iyer as Karan's Wife Barkha Khanna
 Vikram Bhatt as Doctor Singh, Simran's father
 Caroline Wilde as Rachel
 Rabia Maddah as Mel
 Ameet Channa as Bob
 Gary Heron as Judge Francis D'Zouza

Production
The film is based on a newspaper article in which the British Court had allowed a matter involving spirits to be tried. The principal photography of the film started on 17 November 2018 in London.

Reception
Ghost received mostly negative reviews with criticism for its clichéd effects and weak storyline. It performed very poorly on the box office with a collection of 1.82Cr and was considered a box-office bomb.

Soundtrack

This music of the film is composed by Nayeem –Shabir, Sanjeev–Darshan, Arko Pravo Mukherjee, Sonal Pradhan and Vinay Ram Tiwari with lyrics written by Shakeel Azmi, Sanjeev-Ajay, Arko Pravo Mukherjee, Sonal Pradhan and Rashmi Virag.

References

External links

 

2010s Hindi-language films
2019 films
Indian horror thriller films
2019 horror thriller films
Films shot in London
Films set in England
Indian ghost films
Journalism adapted into films